First Doctor comic stories refers to the comic strips devoted to the long-running British science fiction television series Doctor Who, using the likeness of the First Doctor William Hartnell. The strip was launched in Polystyle's TV Comic on 14 November 1964, less than a year after the television series began broadcasting and was the first original spin-off media from the show. This strip began what has become known as the 'Polystyle era': running from 1964 to 1979. The First Doctor starred in this strip running parallel with his appearance on the television show, ending in December 1966, after which TV Comic began creating strips for the Second Doctor. The franchise to print a regular comic strip passed to Doctor Who Magazine (then Doctor Who Weekly) in 1979, and was opened up to multiple franchises in the mid-2000s. During this time, the First Doctor has made various guest appearances as well as starring in some one-off comic strips.

Polystyle comic strips (1964–1966)

History 

TV Comic, according to Doctor Who historian Jeremy Bentham, 'had grown up in the wake of commercial television. Just as publications like Radio Fun had blossomed during the golden years of the wireless so TV Comic began catering for young readerships who watched and liked children's programmes on ITV. TV Comic - despite only having previously featured spin-offs of ITV programmes, decided to pitch for Doctor Who with the BBC, and despite initial reticence from the channel, eventually struck a deal. The strip launched in issue 674 with a cover date of 14 November 1964; hitting the shelves - according to Doctor Who comics historian Paul Scoones - on 8 November 1964. This means that the Doctor Who comic strip in TV Comic was officially the first spin-off media from the show - the first novelization Doctor Who in an exciting adventure with the Daleks not being released until later the same week on 12 November. One immediate difference from the TV show was that the Doctor would be referred to in-strip as 'Doctor Who'.

There were other differences too. The rights to use Doctor Who applied 'then, as now' only applied to the likeness of the actor playing the Doctor and the TARDIS, and the portrayal of any other characters - be they companions or adversaries - would have been a separate negotiation and an increased cost, even prohibitive for companions who would appear in every instalment. Accordingly, the Doctor was given new companions in the first strip, "The Klepton Parasites", two grandchildren Gillian and John. Regarding Doctor Who foes, the situation was very similar. During the First Doctor period of the TV Comic strip, only the inhabitants of Vortis from "The Web Planet" (1965) - the Zarbi and Menoptra - made it into a story. The Doctor's greatest adversaries - the Daleks - could not appear for another reason. This was that creator (Terry Nation) had 'a separate copyright' for the creatures, and had negotiated a deal with TV Century 21 (aka TV21) comics around the same time for their own strip; and copyright could 'only be held by one company at any one time' for the same format. "The Daleks" strip appeared in issue 1 of TV21 (23 January 1965), and ran for one hundred and four instalments, each a page long, ending in issue 104 (14 January 1967).

Writers and artists 

Artists: There were three artists during the TV Comic First Doctor period. Neville Main was the first to draw the First Doctor (and thus to draw any incarnation of the Doctor). Main drew the first 9 stories (46 episodes) of the TVC strip, plus one single episode strip for the 1965 TVC Holiday Special and two single episode strips for the 1965 TVC Annual 1966. Bill Mevin took over for the middle of the run, producing 7 stories (28 episodes) for TVC between October 1965 and April 1966. He also produced one of the two single episode strips for that year's TVC Annual 1967 released some months after his tenure came to an end due to illness. These strips were produced much earlier in the year (April) ready for the more complex print procedure, hence the appearance in the table below which makes it look as if Mevin returned to the script some time later. After Mevin's relatively short tenure, the TVC strip was taken on by John Canning who produced 8 stories (36 episodes) plus two single episode strips for the 1966 TVC Holiday Special and one of the two single episode strips for the 1966 TVC Annual 1967. Canning was thus the last of the three artists to draw the First Doctor for TVC, and, furthermore, would go on to kick off the Second Doctor run which began late December 1966.

Writers: The situation with the scripts is more complex. Writing in 1982, Jeremy Bentham, the first researcher of Doctor Who comic strips, believed these strips to have been written by the artists who drew them. Thus in 'those days the notion of a strip having a separate writer was strictly the prerogative of American comic books'. However, this view was later revised. John Ainsworth, another comic strip historian, said in an interview: 'There's quite a mystery surrounding around who actually wrote the scripts for the early Hartnell Doctor Who strips, or indeed, all the Hartnell Doctor Who strips. It was thought that the artists wrote them, but, after talking to [...] one of the artists, Bill Mevin [...] he doesn't know who wrote them but he knows he did actually work from scripts someone else provided' In the same documentary, Mevin confirmed this saying, TVC strips were 'a production line [...] a conveyor belt. I'd get a script and I'd draw it'. Later research by Paul Scoones in The Comic Strip Companion: 1964-1979 (2012) clarified some aspects of script production. In an overview, Scoones notes: 'Writers and artists were seldom named on the strips, which presents a challenge when trying to credit stories', and while all the artists have been identified, some of the writers 'unfortunately remain unknown'. The first writer Scoones identifies is David Motton with the fifth story of the Neville Main tenure, and a couple more Main strips soon thereafter. This information comes from Motton himself, as indicated in a footnote from Scoones regarding correspondence with the writer between March and May 2012. Motton would go on to script another couple of stories the following year for the TVC Annual 1967 (released September 1966). As these strips were produced earlier in the year, during the change over between the second and third artists Mevin and Canning, Motton ended up writing for all three of the First Doctor artists. Scoones goes on to possibly identify a second writer, Tom Tully from a third writer, Roger Noel Cook. During correspondence with Scoones between February and March 2010, Cook writes he took over the strip from 'a freelance scriptwriter called Tom - I can't for the life of me remember his last name'. Scoones goes on to suggest from further information given by Cook that this was 'Tully, a prolific comic strip writer', adding he later confirmed this with Motton. However, it remains unknown which stories Tully may have written, and indeed if there were other writers involved in the Main and Mevin periods. In an online errata, Scoones subsequently withdrew and corrected this claiming, writing:

"It was Thomas Woodman, not Tully, who worked on the strip. Tully was writing for Valiant in 1965 and worked on strips for Battle and 2000AD until the late 1980s. David Motton appears to have got Woodman and Tully mixed up in his recollection. Roger Noel Cook has subsequently confirmed that the ‘Tom’ whose surname he initially couldn’t recall was Woodman. There is no evidence that Tully worked on the Doctor Who strip."

With respect to Cook, he took over the scripting at the same time that Canning took over the artwork, this 'marking the beginning of a four year collaboration' for TVC on a number of strips. And once again, just like Canning, Cook would go on to work on the Second Doctor run, beginning late December 1966.

Style: Bentham describes Main's output thus: very simplistic in style, consisting of basic line illustrations drawn in a very cartoonish way. During his 45 week stint on the strip he never quite captured the likeness of Hartnell [...] He was, however, quite an inventive storywriter. Of course, given the information above, we now know the stories were not by Main at all.

List of comic strips 

The list below is of all the First Doctor comic strips that appeared in TV Comic (TVC) as well the yearly TV Comic Holiday Special (TVCHS) and TV Comic Annual (TVCA). The order is that designated by the publication date, as integrated by Paul Scoones.

World Distributors comic strips 

World Distributors issued Doctor Who annuals from 1966 (as well as one special). Most of their content was short stories. However, they did also have some comic strips, increasingly so as the years progressed. During the period of the First Doctor, however, there was only one strip, in the annual for 1967.

Doctor Who Magazine comic strips

Doctor Who Magazine

Doctor Who Yearbook

Non-parodic

Both (non-parodic and parodic)

See also
 List of Doctor Who comic stories
 Second Doctor comic stories
 Third Doctor comic stories
 Fourth Doctor comic strips
 Fifth Doctor comic stories
 Sixth Doctor comic stories
 Seventh Doctor comic stories
 Eighth Doctor comic stories
 War Doctor comic stories
 Ninth Doctor comic stories
 Tenth Doctor comic stories
 Eleventh Doctor comic stories
 Twelfth Doctor comic stories

References
General

Ainsworth, John, "Behind the Frame" [I: Polystyle strips (1960s)] in Doctor Who Classic Comics [Issue 1], 9 December 1992, pp. 20–21
Ainsworth, John, "Frame Count" [I: First Doctor Polystyle strips] in Doctor Who Classic Comics [Issue 1], 9 December 1992, p. 19
Bentham, Jeremy, "Doctor Who Comics"/"Comics Checklist" [Polystyle First Doctor] in Doctor Who Monthly (Issue 62), March 1982, pp. 15–18; 23
Hearn, Marcus (director), Stripped for Action - The First Doctor documentary feature with John Ainsworth (Comics Historian); Alan Barnes (Former Doctor Who Magazine Editor); Jeremy Bentham (Comics Historian); Gary Russell (Former Doctor Who Magazine Editor); Bill Mevin (Comics Artist), on Doctor Who: The Time Meddler (DVD), 16 mins., 2008 
Scoones, Paul, The Comic Strip Companion: The Unofficial and Unauthorised Guide to Doctor Who in Comics: 1964-1979, Prestatyn: Telos, 2012

Specific

Comics based on Doctor Who